Nerita peloronta, common name the "bleeding tooth", is a species of sea snail, a marine gastropod mollusc in the family Neritidae.

Description

The shell of this species is large compared with many other Nerite species, reaching lengths of 2 inches. The shell is thick and short spired. Its surface can have slightly raised spiral ridges. The dark red operculum is granulated on its inner side. The color of the shell is yellow, reddish, or creamy, with darker streaks or zigzags. Although many nerites have "teeth" on the columellar edge, this species is notable for the fact that it has an area of red coloration next to the "teeth", hence the common name "Bleeding Tooth".

Distribution
Intertidal splash zones on hard rocky shorelines facing regular wave action. West Indies, West Florida, Bermuda, and the Caribbean.

References

 Récluz, C. 1850. Notice sur le genre Nérita et sur le S.-G. Neritina, avec le catalogue synonymique des Néritines. Journal de Conchyliologie 1: 131–164, 282–288, pls. 3, 7.

External links

Neritidae
Gastropods described in 1758
Taxa named by Carl Linnaeus